Christopher Abell  (11 November 1957 – 26 October 2020) was a British biological chemist. He was Professor of Biological Chemistry at the Department of Chemistry of the University of Cambridge and Todd-Hamied Fellow of Christ's College, Cambridge. On his 2016 election to the Royal Society, the society described his research as having "changed the face of drug discovery."

Education
Abell was educated at St John's College, Cambridge, gaining an Bachelor of Arts degree in Natural Sciences in 1979 followed by PhD on the topic of polyketide biosynthesis for research supervised by James Staunton in 1982.

Career and research
Abell held a research fellowship in the laboratory of David E. Cane at Brown University, Providence, USA, studying terpene biosynthesis (1982–83). In 1984, Abell joined the Department of Chemistry of the University of Cambridge, successively holding the positions of demonstrator, lecturer and reader in chemical biology, and becoming Professor in Biological Chemistry in 2002. He held visiting professorships at the Australian National University in Canberra, University of Santiago de Compostela, University of Canterbury, Christchurch, and the Paul Sabatier University, Toulouse. He was a fellow of Christ's College, Cambridge, from 1986; and was the college's Todd-Hamied Fellow. In 2013 he was appointed the first Director of Postdoctoral Affairs at the University of Cambridge, and in 2016 was appointed Pro-Vice-Chancellor for Research.

Abell published over 200 papers. His research interests include vitamin and amino acid biosynthesis as targets for the rational design of antimicrobials; fragment-based approaches to enzyme inhibition; bacterial and plant riboswitches; reactions in microdroplets; and biological nanotechnology. His former doctoral students include Shankar Balasubramanian.

Commercial ventures
Abell was the co-founder of several companies. In 1999, he co-founded Astex Technology Ltd, which uses fragment-based drug discovery technology to discover cancer therapeutics. In 2001, he co-founded Akubio, which developed biosensors for detecting bacteria and viruses; it was acquired by Inverness Medical Innovations in 2008. In 2010, he co-founded Sphere Fluidics to develop microdroplet technology. In 2012 he co-founded Aqdot, a company developing a new microencapsulation technology.

Personal life
In 1981, he married Katherine Abell, who worked with him at the Department of Chemistry in Cambridge; they had a son. He died suddenly on 26 October 2020.

Awards and honours
His awards include the Imperial Chemical Industries (ICI) Prize in Organic Chemistry in 1992, the Hickinbottom Award of the Royal Society of Chemistry, and a Yamada Science Foundation Award. In 2008 he was the MIT Novartis Lecturer, and in 2011 was a BIC International Fellow at the University of Canterbury, Christchurch, New Zealand. He was elected a Fellow of the Academy of Medical Sciences (FMedSci) in 2012 and a Fellow of the Royal Society (FRS) in 2016.

Selected publications

 
 
 From Microdroplets to Microfluidics: Selective Emulsion Separation in Microfluidic Devices

References

1957 births
20th-century British chemists
Fellows of the Academy of Medical Sciences (United Kingdom)
Members of the University of Cambridge Department of Chemistry
Fellows of Christ's College, Cambridge
Alumni of St John's College, Cambridge
Fellows of the Royal Society of Chemistry
Fellows of the Royal Society
2020 deaths
Brown University fellows
21st-century British chemists